Bythiospeum klemmi is a species of small brackish water snail with an operculum, an aquatic gastropod mollusk in the family Hydrobiidae. This species is endemic to France.

References 

Hydrobiidae
Bythiospeum
Endemic molluscs of Metropolitan France
Gastropods described in 1969
Taxonomy articles created by Polbot